The Sibutu Islands are an archipelago in the southern Philippines. It is geographically and ethnologically the islands are part of Borneo. The archipelago consists of the following inhabited islands; Sibutu, Tumindao, Sitangkai, Omapui, Sipankot, and Bulubulu, as well as other uninhabited islands.

Adjacent bodies of water include the Sulu Sea to the north, and the Celebes Sea to the south. The Sibutu Passage separate the islands from the rest of the Philippines.

References

Geography of Tawi-Tawi
Borneo
Islands of Tawi-Tawi